Tremble or trembles may refer to:

 Tremble (EP) the debut EP by Australian singer Nicole Millar (2016)
 "Tremble" a Nicole Millar song on the Tremble EP (2016)
 "Tremble" (song), the debut single from Lou Rhodes' first solo album
 Tremble dance, a dance performed by receiver honey bees
 "Tremble," a song by Audio Adrenaline from their 2001 album Lift
 "Tremble", a single by Marc et Claude, 2001
 Milk sickness, known as "trembles" in animals

People with the surname:

 Greg Tremble (born 1972), American football safety
 Mary Trembles, one of three women hanged as a result of the 1682 Bideford witch trial
 Roy Tremble, singer with the gospel group The Cathedral Quartet
 Evelyn Tremble, fictional character in Casino Royale (1967 film), played by Peter Sellers

See also
 Tremor